Livezile ("orchards") may refer to several places in Romania:

 Livezile, Alba, a commune in Alba County
 Livezile, Bistrița-Năsăud, a commune in Bistrița-Năsăud County
 Livezile, Mehedinți, a commune in Mehedinți County
 Livezile, Timiș, a commune in Timiș County
 Livezile, a village in Glodeni Commune, Dâmbovița County
 Livezile, a village in Valea Mare Commune, Dâmbovița County
 Livezile, a village in Vizantea-Livezi Commune, Vrancea County